Hall circles (also known as M-circles and N-circles) are a graphical tool in control theory used to obtain values of a closed-loop transfer function from the Nyquist plot (or the Nichols plot) of the associated open-loop transfer function. Hall circles have been introduced in control theory by Albert C. Hall in his thesis.

Construction 
Consider a closed-loop linear control system with open-loop transfer function given by transfer function  and with a unit gain in the feedback loop.

To check the stability of T(s), it is possible to use the Nyquist stability criterion with the Nyquist plot of the open-loop transfer function G(s). Note, however, that only the Nyquist plot of G(s) does not give the actual values of T(s). To get this information from the G(s)-plane, Hall proposed to construct the locus of points in the G(s)-plane such that T(s) has constant magnitude and the also the locus of points in the G(s)-plane such that T(s) has constant phase angle.

Given a positive real value M representing a fixed magnitude, and denoting G(s) by z, the points satisfying  are given by the points z in the G(s)-plane such that the ratio of the distance between z and 0 and the distance between z and -1 is equal to M. The points z satisfying this locus condition are circles of Apollonius, and this locus is known in the context of control systems as M-circles.

Given a positive real value N representing a phase angle, the points satisfying are given by the points z in the G(s)-plane such that the angle between -1 and z and the angle between 0 and z is constant. In other words, the angle opposed to the line segment between -1 and 0 must be constant. This implies that the points z satisfying this locus condition are arcs of circles, and this locus is known in the context of control systems as N-circles.

Usage 

To use the Hall circles, a plot of M and N circles is done over the Nyquist plot of the open-loop transfer function. The points of the intersection between these graphics give the corresponding value of the closed-loop transfer function.

Hall circles are also used with the Nichols plot and in this setting, are also known as Nichols chart. The advantage of using Nichols chart is that adjusting the gain of the open loop transfer function directly reflects in up and down translation of the Nichols plot in the chart.

See also 

 Nyquist-plot
 Nichols plot

Notes

References 

 
 

Control theory
Algorithms
Control engineering